Badondo is a town in northwestern Congo (Brazzaville).  It lies close to the border with Gabon and is also not far from the border with Cameroon.

Mining 

It is the site of iron ore deposits.

See also 

 Iron ore in Africa

References 

Populated places in the Republic of the Congo